Odlezly Lake (in Czech Odlezelské jezero, sometimes Mladotické- or Potvorovské-) is the youngest lake in the Czech Republic. The lake and its surroundings is a protected natural area.

The lake is located near small village Odlezly and close to Kalec is an administrative part of village Žihle, under the hill Potvorovský (546 m). Two creeks discharge here: Mladotický and Odlezelský.

During May 25/May 26, 1872 heavy rain flooded the Mladotický creek. During night of May 27/May 28 the Permo-Carboniferous layers on west slope of the hill slipped and blocked the stream. The flooding was not the only reason of the landslide - structure of the hillside resulted in constant slow shift down, sandstone quarries used for centuries had lowered stability of the slope and the recently built railway Plzeň – Žatec cut yet another dent to the hill.

The landslide destroyed the railroad which got later rebuilt on the opposite side of the valley. Levee of large Mladotický pond (Mladotický rybník, few kilometers downstream, 90 hectares) was broken by the flooded stream; the pond was never rebuilt.

The lake has area of 4.5 hectares, length around 500 m and its width varies between 70–100 m. Its surface is 413 m above sea level. Depth was 7.7 m in 1972 and only 6.7 m in 1999 - the lake is slowly clogging up and without human intervention it would disappear within decades.

On March 7, 1975 the lake and its surroundings (68.3 hectares) were declared as protected natural area and the zone around it (31 hectares) is subject of restrictions.

External links
 Basic facts about the lake 

Lakes of the Czech Republic
Plzeň-North District